Lasse Møller (born 11 June 1996) is a Danish handball player who plays for SG Flensburg-Handewitt and the Danish national team. He has also played several matches for the Danish national junior and youth teams.

In May 2019, he signed a contract with the German club SG Flensburg-Handewitt.

He made his debut on the Danish national team on 26 October 2017.

Individual awards
Most Valuable Player of the IHF Men's Junior World Championship: 2017
Top scorer of the IHF Men's Junior World Championship: 2017

References

External links

1996 births
Living people
Danish male handball players
People from Svendborg Municipality
Sportspeople from the Region of Southern Denmark